Colin Wells  is an English actor best known for his roles of Johnno Dean in the long-running television drama series Hollyoaks, Jake Booth in the revival of Crossroads and Sam Curtis in CI5: The New Professionals.

Selected filmography
CI5: The New Professionals - Sam Curtis, 1999
Titus - Martius, 1999
Crossroads - Jake Booth, c.2001-2003
Hollyoaks - Johnno Dean, 2003–2005, 2017
Mr Bean - Guest, 2006 (filmed in 1995)
Casualty - DI Moreland, 2005–2009

External links

Living people
English male television actors
1963 births
20th-century English male actors
21st-century English male actors
People from Greenwich
Male actors from London